List of Carnegie libraries in Washington may refer to:

 List of Carnegie libraries in Washington (state)
 List of Carnegie libraries in Washington, D.C.